Sann or SANN may refer to:

 Southern Arizona News Network (aka SANN), a regional 24-hour television news network
 Son Sann (1911–2000), a Cambodian politician
 Sann, a town in Sindh
 The former German name of the River Savinja in Slovenia
 SANN, a 2005 album entitled "Sylvain Auclair & Norman Nawrocki"
  Sann Gate, a location in the Ranikot Fort in Pakistan